Vladislav Jovanović (born 9 June 1933) is a Serbian diplomat who was Minister of Foreign Affairs of Yugoslavia.

Education
Jovanović was born in Žitni Potok, present-day Serbia in 1933 to Milorad Jovanović and Dragica Jovanović, née Petković, both of whom were teachers. He completed his high school studies in Belgrade in 1951. 
After that, he graduated from University of Belgrade Faculty of Law.

Career
Jovanović was a career diplomat with more than 40 years experience in the diplomatic corps of Yugoslavia. He started his career in Yugoslav Ministry of Foreign Affairs back in 1957. Shortly afterwards, he worked as an officer to Yugoslav Embassy in Brussels, Belgium from 1960 to 1964 before taking a position in the Ministry again from 1964 to 1967.

Jovanović was the Second Secretary in Yugoslav Embassy in Ankara, Turkey from 1967 to 1971 and Advisor in Yugoslav Embassy in London, United Kingdom from 1975 to 1979 before becoming Head of Directorate for Western Europe in Yugoslav Ministry of Foreign Affairs on 1 July 1980.

From 13 November 1985, Vladislav Jovanović served as Yugoslav Ambassador to Turkey until 1989. After that, he was Ambassador in Ministry of Foreign Affairs before being appointed to the position of the Minister of Foreign Affairs.

Following the overthrow of Slobodan Milošević on 5 October 2000, Jovanović was dismissed from the position of the Head of the Mission of Yugoslavia to the United Nations in New York City. He returned to Belgrade and retired from active diplomatic service.

Jovanović took a stand at the trial of Slobodan Milošević at the Hague Tribunal on 14 February 2005, testifying for the defence.

Occasionally, Jovanović gives interviews to the media criticizing the Western Governments for their politics towards Serbia. Commenting on the incidents in North Kosovo in 2011, Jovanović said: "It should be clear to the West that their policies of arrogantly ignoring Serbian interests will not hold Serbia by their side. 
Similarly, in an interview on 26 September 2011 he stated that regarding Kosovo, Serbia did not use its strongest trump card yet - to stop with policies of approaching Euro Atlantic structures, which should have been done long time ago, but even now is not too late.

See also
 List of Foreign Affairs Ministers of Yugoslavia
 Ministry of Foreign Affairs (Serbia)

References

External links
Vladislav Jovanović biography  at Republic of Serbia Ministry of Foreign Affairs

1933 births
Living people
People from Prokuplje
Permanent Representatives of Yugoslavia to the United Nations
Ambassadors of Yugoslavia to Turkey
Foreign ministers of Yugoslavia
Foreign ministers of Serbia